The  is a nuclear power plant located in the town of Kashima-chou in the city of Matsue in the Shimane Prefecture. It is owned and operated by the Chūgoku Electric Power Company.

This plant was once said to be the closest nuclear power plant to a prefecture capital. However, on March 31, 2005, the area of Kashima-chou merged with Matsue (it was formerly in the Yatsuka District), making it exactly the same city as the prefecture capital.

New Scientist magazine has reported that, in June 2006, a previously unknown geological fault was identified close to the Shimane Nuclear Power Plant, but it is expected to be years before the plant is strengthened.

Reactors on site

See also 

 List of nuclear power plants in Japan

References

External links

Chugoku Electric Power Company 中国電力
Administration for the power plant 島根の原子力行政
Site specifically for the Shimane NPP c/o Chugoku Electric 中国電力・島根原子力発電所

1970s establishments in Japan
Nuclear power stations in Japan
Buildings and structures in Shimane Prefecture
Nuclear power stations using advanced boiling water reactors
Nuclear power stations with proposed reactors